Malcolm Kokocinski (born 28 July 1991) is a Swedish professional golfer.

After playing college golf for College of the Desert in Palm Springs, California in the United States, Kokocinski became a Thailand-based player on the Asian Development Tour, racking up 17 top-10 finishes from 2013 to 2018.

In May 2018, he won the Bangladesh Open on the Asian Tour. With the win he rose to 270 on the Official World Golf Ranking.

Professional wins (2)

Asian Tour wins (1)

Swedish Golf Tour wins (1)

References

External links
Malcolm Kokocinski at the Asian Development Tour official site (archived)

Swedish male golfers
Asian Tour golfers
Sportspeople from Skåne County
People from Eslöv Municipality
Malcolm Kokocinski
1991 births
Living people